Joseph R. Beyrle (romanized: Dzhozef Vilyamovich Bayyerli; August 25, 1923 – December 12, 2004) is the only known American soldier to have served in combat with both the United States Army and the Soviet Red Army in World War II. He took part in Mission Albany, the airborne landings of the 101st Airborne Division on June 5–6, 1944, as a member of the 506th Parachute Infantry Regiment. He was captured by the Germans and sent east as a prisoner of war.

After several unsuccessful attempts, Beyrle escaped from the German Stalag III-C in January 1945 and joined a Soviet tank battalion under the command of Aleksandra Samusenko. Wounded, he was evacuated and eventually made his way to the United States in April 1945. Beyrle died in 2004 and was buried at Arlington National Cemetery.

Early life
Joe was the third of seven children born to William and Elizabeth Beyrle, whose parents had come to America from Germany in the 1800s. He was six years old when the Great Depression struck. His father, a factory worker, lost his job; the family was evicted from their home and was forced to move in with Joe's grandmother. Some of his earliest memories, Beyrle later told his children, were of standing in government food lines with his father. His two older brothers dropped out of high school and joined the Civilian Conservation Corps, an unemployment work-relief program, sending home enough money to allow the rest of the family to stay together. An older sister died of scarlet fever at age 16.

US Army
Upon his enlistment, Beyrle volunteered to become a paratrooper, and after completing basic airborne infantry training at Camp Toccoa he was assigned to the 506th Parachute Infantry Regiment of the 101st Airborne Division, the "Screaming Eagles". Beyrle specialized in radio communications and demolition, and was first stationed in Ramsbury, England, to prepare for the upcoming Allied invasion from the west. After nine months of training, Beyrle completed two missions in occupied France in April and May 1944, delivering gold to the French Resistance.

After landing in Saint-Côme-du-Mont, Sergeant Beyrle lost contact with his fellow paratroopers, but succeeded in blowing up a power station. He performed other sabotage missions before being captured by German soldiers a few days later.

Prisoner of war

Over the next seven months, Beyrle was held in seven German prisons. He escaped twice, and was both times recaptured. Beyrle and his fellow prisoners had been hoping to find the Red Army, which was a short distance away. After the second escape (in which he and his companions set out for Poland but boarded a train to Berlin by mistake), Beyrle was turned over to the Gestapo by a German civilian. Beaten and tortured, he was released to the German military after officials stepped in and determined that the Gestapo had no jurisdiction over prisoners of war. The Gestapo were about to shoot Beyrle and his comrades, claiming that he was an American spy who had parachuted into Berlin.

Beyrle was taken to the Stalag III-C POW camp in Alt Drewitz, from which he escaped in early January 1945. He headed east, hoping to meet up with the Soviet army. Encountering a Soviet tank brigade in the middle of January, he raised his hands, holding a pack of Lucky Strike cigarettes, and shouted in Russian, 'Amerikansky tovarishch! ("American comrade!"). Beyrle was eventually able to persuade the battalion's commander (Aleksandra Samusenko, reportedly the only female tank officer of that rank in the war) to allow him to fight alongside the unit on its way to Berlin. Beyrle began a month-long stint in a Soviet tank battalion, where his demolitions expertise was appreciated.

Soviet Army
Beyrle's new battalion was the one that freed his former camp, Stalag III-C, at the end of January, but in the first week of February, he was wounded during an attack by German dive bombers. He was evacuated to a Soviet hospital in Landsberg an der Warthe (now Gorzów Wielkopolski in Poland), where he received a visit from Soviet Marshal Georgy Zhukov, who, intrigued by the only non-Soviet in the hospital, learned his story through an interpreter, and provided Beyrle with official papers in order to rejoin American forces.

Joining a Soviet military convoy, Beyrle arrived at the U.S. embassy in Moscow in February 1945, only to learn that he had been reported by the U.S. War Department as killed in action on June 10, 1944, in France. A funeral mass had been held in his honor in Muskegon, and his obituary was published in the local newspaper. Embassy officers in Moscow, unsure of his bona fides, placed him under Marine guard in the Metropol Hotel until his identity was established through his fingerprints.

Post-military
Beyrle returned home to Michigan on April 21, 1945, and celebrated V-E Day two weeks later in Chicago. He was married to JoAnne Hollowell in 1946—coincidentally, in the same church and by the same priest who had held his funeral mass two years earlier. Beyrle worked for Brunswick Corporation for 28 years, retiring as a shipping supervisor.

His unique service earned him medals from U.S. President Bill Clinton and Russian President Boris Yeltsin at a ceremony in the Rose Garden of the White House marking the 50th anniversary of D-Day in 1994.

Death and legacy

Beyrle died in his sleep of heart failure on December 12, 2004, during a visit to Toccoa, Georgia, where he had trained as a paratrooper in 1942. He was 81. He was buried with honors in Section 1 of Arlington National Cemetery in April, 2005.

Beyrle and his wife JoAnne had a daughter, Julie, and two sons. The elder son, Joe Beyrle II, served in the 101st Airborne during the Vietnam War. His son John Beyrle served as the United States Ambassador to Russia 2008–2012.

On September 17, 2002, a book by Thomas Taylor about Beyrle, The Simple Sounds of Freedom, was published by Random House. A Ballantine paperback version, Behind Hitler's Lines, came out June 1, 2004.

In 2005, a plaque was unveiled on the wall of the church in Saint-Côme-du-Mont, France, where Beyrle landed on June 6, 1944. A permanent plaque was dedicated at the site on July 5, 2014.

An exhibition devoted to Joe Beyrle's life and wartime experiences was shown in Moscow and three other Russian cities in 2010. The exhibition opened a four-city American tour at The National World War II Museum in New Orleans, with showings in Toccoa and Omaha in 2011, and Beyrle's hometown of Muskegon in June 2012. A permanent installation of the exhibition is now on display at the USS Silversides Museum in Muskegon.

Awards and decorations

Notes

External links
 NBC Nightly News Obituary, Dec. 2004
 Joseph Beyrle – Soldier and Hero who fought for the USA and USSR

1923 births
2004 deaths
United States Army personnel of World War II
Soviet military personnel of World War II
Burials at Arlington National Cemetery
American prisoners of war in World War II
World War II prisoners of war held by Germany
Military personnel from Michigan
People from Muskegon, Michigan
United States Army soldiers